Liane Merciel is the pseudonym of an American fantasy author.

Merciel is of Korean and European ancestry. She grew up in Germany, South Korea, and other locations in a military family. A graduate of Yale University and the College of William & Mary Law School, she is a practicing attorney in Pennsylvania.

Liane Merciel is the author of the ongoing Ithelas series of fantasy novels. She has also written one novel for the Dragon Age fantasy franchise, and three novels (Nightglass, Nightblade and Hellknight) for Paizo Publishing's Pathfinder Tales series, set in the Pathfinder roleplaying game world of Golarion.

Bibliography
The River King's Road (2010)
Heaven's Needle (2011)
Nightglass (2012)
Dragon Age: Last Flight (2014)
Nightblade (2014)
Pathfinder Tales: Hellknight (2016)

References

External links
Official website

21st-century American novelists
American fantasy writers
American women novelists
Novelists from Pennsylvania
Living people
Women science fiction and fantasy writers
21st-century American women writers
Year of birth missing (living people)